Abantiades barcas is a moth of the family Hepialidae. It is endemic to the Australian Capital Territory, New South Wales and Queensland.

References

External links
Australian Faunal Directory

Hepialidae
Moths of Australia
Moths described in 1914